Robert Lee Jr. (born September 17, 1971) is an American stand-up comedian, actor, and podcaster. From 2001 to 2009, Lee was a cast member on MADtv, and he co-starred in the ABC single-camera sitcom series Splitting Up Together alongside Jenna Fischer and Oliver Hudson between 2018 and 2019. Lee has also appeared in the films Harold & Kumar Go to White Castle (2004), Pineapple Express (2008), and The Dictator (2012). He had a guest appearance as the cynical, burned-out Dr. Kang on FX on Hulu's TV comedy series Reservation Dogs.

Lee co-hosts the podcast TigerBelly with his ex-partner, Khalyla Kuhn; he is also the co-host of the podcast Bad Friends with Andrew Santino.

Early life and education
Lee was born on September 17, 1971, to Korean immigrant parents Jeanie and Robert Lee. He and his younger brother Steve grew up in Poway, California. His parents owned clothing stores in both Escondido and Encinitas, California.

Lee has said he was sexually assaulted at nine years old.

He attended Painted Rock Elementary School, Twin Peaks Middle School, and Poway High School. In high school, he was part of a breakdancing team. At 18, Lee moved out of his parents' home and took jobs in restaurants and coffee shops in the San Diego area while attending Palomar College, which he later dropped out of.

Career

Lee worked various jobs at cafes and restaurants before pursuing a career in comedy. In 1994, the coffee shop where he was working abruptly closed. "I just went next door to get a job," he said, "which was The Comedy Store in San Diego" (also known as the La Jolla Comedy Store). After a few months of working odd jobs at the club, he decided to try stand-up during one of their amateur nights. Within a year of doing regular comedy sets, he received offers to open for both Pauly Shore and Carlos Mencia. Lee went on to work regularly at The Comedy Store in Los Angeles, a comedy club owned by Pauly Shore's mother Mitzi.

Lee has said that his parents had hoped he would continue on with the family business and were less than supportive of his comedic pursuits at first. During a podcast interview conducted by fellow actor and comedian Joe Rogan on February 1, 2011, Lee stated that during the first few years he did stand-up, his parents barely spoke to him. However, after his appearance on The Tonight Show with Jay Leno his father called him, asked how much he had to pay to be on the show, and then apologized for not supporting his comedy career.

Lee has included his family in some of his work; his younger brother has appeared in several non-speaking roles on MADtv, and his entire family has appeared in a sketch on the show. Lee also pitched a sitcom to Comedy Central in 2007 about a Korean family which was to star his own family.

Lee hosted the 9th MusiCares MAP Fund Benefit Concert in 2013.

In 2020, Lee began co-hosting the Bad Friends podcast with Andrew Santino.

MADtv
In 2001, Lee joined the cast of MADtv, making him the show's first and only Asian cast member. He has publicly expressed that he dreaded playing the characters Bae Sung and Connie Chung, as well as the "Average Asian" skits. Lee remained with the cast until the series' cancellation in 2009 and returned briefly when MADtv was revived in 2016 on The CW. Some of Lee's recurring characters included:

TigerBelly podcast 

TigerBelly is a video podcast hosted by Bobby Lee and his ex-partner, Khalyla Kuhn, that they started in 2015, with appearances by technical engineer Gilbert Galon and producer George Kimmel. Kuhn became interested in doing podcasts of her own after she was a guest on the DVDASA podcast. The show's intro song "Shadow Gook" was written and produced by Lee and performed by Lee and Kuhn. The hosts discuss events from their lives and news topics from popular culture, often revolving around Asian American issues related to the entertainment industry, adolescence, sexuality, ethnicity, racism, and politics.

Lee and Erik Griffin initially pitched a podcast to All Things Comedy, and they were immediately signed but they could never make the time to meet. Around this time Lee and Kuhn were visiting her family in the Philippines, when Kuhn came down with serious heart trouble. She spent weeks in hospitals and couldn't return to her nursing job. She needed something to do to keep busy and so started her own podcast. Lee came on her show and the chemistry was so good that Lee decided to instead focus on podcasts with Kuhn.

As TigerBelly grew, Lee and Kuhn needed an engineer to watch over the computer and consult on technical issues, so they asked Gilbert to handle the technical side of the podcast; Lee had met Gilbert at a viewing of a Manny Pacquiao fight. Lee met future TigerBelly producer George Kimmel when he was working on The Station comedy channel for Maker Studios, where Kimmel was working as a producer.

Since 2018 Lee has made several appearances as recurring character Jin Jeong in the new Magnum P.I. TV-series.

Personal life

Lee began taking methamphetamine and marijuana around age 12, and heroin by age 15 and went through three drug-rehabilitation attempts before becoming sober when he was 17. Lee relapsed on Vicodin and ended 12 years of sobriety after receiving negative feedback from a producer. He got sober after MADtv producer Lauren Dombrowski fought for him after he was fired from the show a second time, a story which Lee discusses in his appearance on the pilot episode of Comedy Central's TV series This Is Not Happening. On TigerBelly Episode 224, Lee admitted to guest Theo Von that he had relapsed after his father's death in August 2019 from Parkinson's disease. He subsequently went to rehab and became sober again. Lee has stated that he is a recovering alcoholic.

Lee is long time Arsenal Football Club supporter.

Lee is also an avid fan of computer games, playing FIFA, Stardew Valley, Elder Scrolls, Red Dead Redemption 2, and the Witcher series.

Lee's younger brother, Steve Lee, is a musician and also a comedian. He hosts The Steebee Weebee podcast and co-hosts the Scissor Bros podcast with comedian Jeremiah Watkins. Steve has also made guest appearances alongside Bobby on MADtv, especially in sketches featuring Kim Jong-il and Tank.

Filmography

Film

Television

Music videos

References

Sources

External links

 
 Official Mad TV Website

1971 births
Living people
American male comedians
American male film actors
American impressionists (entertainers)
American male television actors
American male voice actors
Male actors from San Diego
American male actors of Korean descent
21st-century American male actors
American sketch comedians
American stand-up comedians
Comedians from California
21st-century American comedians
American comedians of Asian descent